Universidad Mesoamericana (in English, Mesoamerican University) is a private university in Guatemala. It has branches in Guatemala City and Quetzaltenango.

History
In 1971, the Salesians of Don Bosco association signed an agreement of academic cooperation with the Francisco Marroquín University and since 1972 they developed humanities and educational programmes.

Drawing on the experience and academic development that had been made, the procedures which led to the foundation of the Universidad Mesoamericana started in 1996. It was approved by the Central American University Council of Private Higher Education in Guatemala on 1 October 1999.

In 2000, they developed the faculties of Humanities and Social Sciences. A year later, in partnership with the Association of Managers of Guatemala, they established the Escuela Superior de Alta Gerencia (ESAG), to provide expertise.

In 2002, another branch was established in Quetzaltenango as part of the Central American University which is the High School Senior Management headquarters. Courses began in Computer Engineering and Business Finance in 2008.

Faculties
In 2006 there was a restructuring of faculties and they are now as follows:

Faculty of Social Communication
Faculty of Humanities and Social Sciences
Faculty of Medicine
Faculty of Economics
Faculty of Engineering
Faculty of Law
Faculty of Architecture

References

External links
Guatemala City official site
Quetzaltenango official site

Educational institutions established in 1996
Universities in Guatemala City
Quetzaltenango
1996 establishments in Guatemala